UWF Fury Hour was an American professional wrestling television program that premiered October 1, 1990 on SportsChannel America, then moved to Prime Ticket as UWF Thunder Hour in 1992. 

ESPN2 repackaged existing SportsChannel America and Prime Ticket episodes into a half-hour format in 1995.

Todd Okerlund's Classic Wrestling repackaged some of the UWF library into In Demand pay-per-view events between 2002 and 2004.

Episode Guide

SportsChannel America (1990-1991)

Prime Ticket (1992)

ESPN2 (1995)

In Demand (2002-2004)

See also
UWF Beach Brawl
UWF Blackjack Brawl

References

Universal Wrestling Federation (Herb Abrams)